Andreas Andreadis (born 14 January 1982) is a Greek male volleyball player. He was part of the Greece men's national volleyball team at the 2006 FIVB Volleyball Men's World Championship in Japan. He currently plays for Greek club AONS Milon.

Sporting achievements

Clubs

International competitions
 2005/2006   CEV Top Teams Cup, with Panathinaikos Athens
 2008/2009   CEV Cup, with Panathinaikos Athens
 2017/2018   CEV Challenge Cup, with Olympiacos Piraeus

National Championships 
 2005/2006  Greek Championship, with Panathinaikos Athens  
 2009/2010  Greek Championship, with Olympiacos Piraeus
 2010/2011  Greek Championship, with Olympiacos Piraeus 
 2016/2017  Greek Championship, with PAOK Thessaloniki
 2017/2018  Greek Championship, with Olympiacos Piraeus
 2018/2019  Greek Championship, with Olympiacos Piraeus
 2020/2021  Greek Championship, with Olympiacos Piraeus

National Cups
 2006/2007  Greek Cup, with Panathinaikos Athens
 2007/2008  Greek Cup, with Panathinaikos Athens
 2010/2011  Greek Cup, with Olympiacos Piraeus

National League Cups 
 2017/2018  Greek League Cup, with Olympiacos Piraeus
 2018/2019  Greek League Cup, with Olympiacos Piraeus

Super Cups
 2006  Greek Super Cup, with Panathinaikos Athens
 2010  Greek Super Cup, with Olympiacos Piraeus

References

External links
profile, club career, info at greekvolley.gr 
 
Andreadis' full profile at volleyball-movies.net

1982 births
Living people
Greek men's volleyball players
Olympiacos S.C. players
Panathinaikos V.C. players
Aris V.C. players
Iraklis V.C. players
PAOK V.C. players
Sportspeople from Eastern Macedonia and Thrace
People from Evros (regional unit)